Mulay Ahmed ed Dhahabi (also spelt Moulay Ahmad ad Dahabi), known fully as 'Abul Abbas Mulay Ahmad ud-Dhahabi bin Ismail as-Samin (1677 – 5 March 1729), was the Sultan of Morocco in 1727–1728 and 1728–1729.

He was born at Meknes in 1677, as a son of Ismail Ibn Sharif. Between 1699 and 1700 he was the Khalifa of Tadla. He ascended the throne on 22 March 1727, after his father's death.

He was deposed in 1728 by Abdalmalik of Morocco, yet he was restored briefly afterwards at Oued Beht. He was deposed once more, on the day of his death on 5 March 1729 at Meknes. He was succeeded by his half-brother Abdallah of Morocco.

References 

1677 births
1729 deaths
17th-century Arabs
18th-century Arabs
People from Meknes
17th-century Moroccan people
18th-century Moroccan people
18th-century monarchs in Africa
'Alawi dynasty monarchs